Estimata clavata is a moth of the family Noctuidae. It is found in India.

References

Moths described in 1907
Noctuinae